The Lighthouse Christian College is an independent non-denominational Christian co-educational early learning primary and secondary day school located in the Melbourne suburb of Keysborough, Victoria, Australia,

The College has established a sister school, located in East Cranbourne.

Overview 
Lighthouse Christian College has been active for over two decades. From beginnings in 1989, Pastor Richard Warner's (president) vision has been fulfilled, with the school growing to over 600 students. It is one of the most multi-cultural schools in the independent sector in Australia.

In 2009 The Age newspaper reported that Lighthouse was the leading school in Victoria for the proportion of student graduates who proceeded to a tertiary education. The College continues to rake in marvellous accolades such as outstanding NAPLAN marks across the board and with a Year 8 student receiving the highest score in Victoria for the Australian Mathematics Competition. What is remarkable about the result is the exceptionally high number of students who do not speak English as their language of the home environment, and the socio economic background of these homes.

In 2000, the current Primary classrooms, science labs and the C-Block classrooms and offices opened. Later, in 2004, a new I.T Lab, Visual-Communication/Art classrooms, D-Block classrooms and staffroom. A Home-Economics room was planned but was turned into a Drama room, and later a homeroom. However, having received sufficient funding, work became under way to install fittings and appliances. The BER funding allowed the recent construction of dynamic new resources visible from Springvale Road. These include language laboratory facilities.

The school is affiliated with the Lighthouse Church, part of the Australian Christian Churches, but staff and students come from may church affiliations.

The Home-Economics room was opened at the beginning of 2012. The Creative Learning Center, The Hub (Library, seminar rooms and computer room) and The Language Express buildings were all opened Mid 2009. The Creative Learning Center provides support for children from Kinder through to Year 12. The students learn Mandarin in the language express building which is also fitted with a third computer facility.

See also 

 List of schools in Victoria
 List of high schools in Victoria

References

External links
School website

Private secondary schools in Melbourne
Private primary schools in Melbourne
Educational institutions established in 1989
1989 establishments in Australia
Nondenominational Christian schools in Melbourne
Buildings and structures in the City of Greater Dandenong